The 2007 Faroe Islands Cup was played between March 10 and August 15, 2007 and it was won by EB/Streymur. It was the first time they won the cup.

Only the first teams of Faroese football clubs were allowed to participate. The First Round involved teams from the third and fourth divisions. Teams from the highest two divisions entered the competition in the Second Round.

First round

Second round

Quarterfinals

Semifinals

First legs

Second legs

Final

Top goalscorers

See also
Faroe Islands Super Cup

References

Faroe Islands Cup seasons
Cup